Sara Hennessy is a British scholar. As of 2022, she is a Professor of Teacher Development and Pedagogical Innovation in the Faculty of Education at the University of Cambridge. Hennessy has worked in the field of EdTech for over three decades, focusing particularly on professional development, teacher inquiry, and interactive pedagogy, including in sub-Saharan Africa. She is a Research Director of EdTech Hub, a multi-million-pound 8-year program funded by the UK's Foreign, Commonwealth and Development Office.

Biography
Hennessy graduated with a Bachelor of Science in Social Psychology from the London School of Economics and Political Science in 1981 and a Masters of Arts from the University of Cambridge.  She also holds a PhD in Psychology from the University College London.

Hennessy was a Research Fellow at the Institute of Educational Technology, Open University from 1986 to 1999 before becoming a lecturer in Teacher Development and Pedagogical Innovation at the University of Cambridge in 2008 until 2011. She was a Senior Lecturer at the university from 2011 until 2015 and a Reader from 2015 until 2021 when she became a professor.

Hennessy is a member of the Faculty's STeM Academic group and a Fellow of Hughes Hall college. She also serves as a founding member and co-leader of the Cambridge Educational Dialogue Research (CEDiR) Group  Professor Sara co-directs the EdTech Hub where she functions as a Research Director, overseeing the ‘Teachers’ theme and convening the Hub's Advisory Pool.

Selected publications
 Hennessy S, Ruthven K, SUE Brindley.(2005). Teacher perspectives on integrating ICT into subject teaching: commitment, constraints, caution, and change. Journal of curriculum studies 37 (2), 155-192N1155 	
 Osborne J, Hennessy S. Futurelab 480	(2003). Literature review in science education and the role of ICT: Promise, problems and future directions. 
 Hennessy S. Studies in Science Education (1993). 22 (1), 1-41.  452. Situated cognition and cognitive apprenticeship: Implications for classroom learning. 
 Haßler B, Major L. Hennessy S. Journal of Computer Assisted Learning Tablet use in schools: A critical review of the evidence for learning outcomes. 32 (2), 139-156. 391	2016 
 Hennessy S, Harrison D, Wamakote L.Teacher factors influencing classroom use of ICT in Sub-Saharan Africa. Itupale online journal of African studies 2 (1), 39-54. 386	2010 
British Journal of Educational Technology- published by Wiley on behalf of the British Educational Research Association

References

Alumni of University College London
Alumni of the University of Cambridge
People from Cambridge
Living people
Year of birth missing (living people)